A list of mainland Chinese films released in 2005. There were 260 Chinese feature films produced of which 43 were screened in China in 2005.

See also 
 2005 in China

References

External links
IMDb list of Chinese films

Chinese
Films
2005